Pay Day (1922) is an American short film made by First National Pictures. Charlie Chaplin wrote, directed, and starred in the film. It is Chaplin's final two-reel short film.

Plot
Chaplin plays a laborer on a house construction site. When he gets paid, his wife wants all the money, but he manages to keep enough of it to go out drinking. He returns home just in time to pretend he has just woken up to go to work.

Cast
Charlie Chaplin as Laborer
Phyllis Allen as Laborer's Wife
Mack Swain as Foreman
Edna Purviance as Foreman's Daughter
Syd Chaplin as Mustachioed Workman / Laborer's Friend / Lunch Cart Owner
John Rand as Workman 
Loyal Underwood as Bearded Workman
Henry Bergman as Fat Workman
Al Ernest Garcia as Tall Workman / Policeman

Reception

According to Chaplin biographer Jeffrey Vance, "Pay Day, is a delightful, polished work that was Chaplin’s last two-reel comedy." He notes that Monta Bell, a future director and producer, was engaged as a general assistant and helped Chaplin develop the film's scenario on paper prior to production. This made it possible for Chaplin to make Pay Day in 31 production days (a sharp contrast to the five months required to complete his previous two-reel comedy, The Idle Class).

References

External links

 

1922 films
1922 comedy films
Silent American comedy films
American silent short films
American black-and-white films
Short films directed by Charlie Chaplin
First National Pictures films
1922 short films
American comedy short films
1920s American films